Argophyllum is a genus in the Argophyllaceae family comprising eighteen species of shrubs and small trees. They feature alternate, simple leaves, often silvery white underneath. They appear in Australia and New Caledonia, where several species are nickel hyperaccumulators.

Species
 Argophyllum brevipetalum (New Caledonia)
 Argophyllum cryptophlebum (Australia)
 Argophyllum curtum (Australia)
 Argophyllum ellipticum (New Caledonia)
 Argophyllum ferrugineum (Australia)
 Argophyllum grunowii (New Caledonia)
 Argophyllum heterodontum (Australia)
 Argophyllum iridescens (Australia)
 Argophyllum jagonis (Australia)
 Argophyllum lejourdanii (Australia)
 Argophyllum loxotrichum (Australia)
 Argophyllum montanum (New Caledonia)
 Argophyllum nitidum (New Caledonia)
 Argophyllum nullumense (Australia)
 Argophyllum palumense (Australia)
 Argophyllum pungens (Mongolia)
 Argophyllum riparium (New Caledonia)
 Argophyllum verae (Australia)
 Argophyllum vernicosum (New Caledonia)

References

Argophyllaceae
Flora of New Caledonia
Flora of New South Wales
Flora of Queensland
Asterales genera